Celina Kanunnikava  is a Polish-Belarusian artist. Her works are in the collection of Museum of Modern Art, Warsaw, and in private collections in Poland and abroad.

Work 

Kanunnikava's artworks span painting, computer graphics, and mixed media/installations. They are inspired by architecture and physical materials characteristic for totalitarian regimes, such as widespread use of concrete, gold, and marble. The paintings depict gigantic buildings of the regime power and control infrastructure, including  prisons, secret police archives, official buildings, headquarters, and bureaus of official propaganda media. The objects and buildings depicted symbolize not just Belarusian regime but other similar power relations and systems.

The artist is engaged in charity auctions and initiatives in both Belarus and Poland.

Awards 
 "Nowy obraz/Nowe spojrzenie" (UAP Poznań) - main prize (2014)
 Winner of President of Wroclaw Award in the 12th edition of Geppert Competition, Wroclaw, 2016
 Medal of Young Art, Poznań, 2017
 11. Triennale of Small Art Forms in Torun, 2019 – III prize
 Compass of Young Art, Warszawa, 2020

Selected exhibitions

Solo exhibitions 
 Internal Diseases, Assembly Gallery, Poznan, Poland
 Internal Diseases, MBWA, Leszno, Poland, 2017        
 The Untitled, Assembly Gallery, Poznan, Poland, 2016                             
 Masse und Macht / Mass and power, WOZOWNIA Gallery, Torun, Poland, 2016  
 47 milliseconds, Szyperska Gallery, Poznan, Poland, 2013
 What a beautiful, sunny day, Stara Rzeźnia Gallery, Poznan, Poland, 2012

Group 
 Great Patriotic, with Endre Tot, Hanna Shumska, Vitalii Shupliak, BWA Bydgoszcz, Poland, 2022
 21 Presentations - Leszno 2020. In the beginning, the weather changed MBWA Leszno, Poland, 2020
 A thing about collecting. What is all this for? MBWA Leszno, Poland, 2020
 Paint, also known as Blood. Women, Affect, and Desire in Contemporary Painting, Museum of Modern Art, Warsaw, Poland, 2019
 The sadness of modernism: oppression and depression, City Gallery, Wroclaw, Poland, 2019
 Girl and gun, House of Colonels, La Oliva, Fuerteventura, Spain, 2018
 Island and Atolls: the Mapping of Imagination, WOZOWNIA Gallery, Torun, Poland, 2017
 The Next Day, Assembly Gallery, Poznan, Poland, 2016
 Love. Aids. Riot. Sex. III, Kunstquartier Bethanien, Berlin, Germany, 2014

References

Polish contemporary artists
21st-century Polish women artists
Belarusian women artists
Artists from Minsk
21st-century Belarusian artists
Year of birth missing (living people)
Living people